Siglo XXI (Spanish for 21st century) may refer to:

 Siglo XXI Convention Centre, in Mérida, Yucatán
 Siglo Veintiuno, a Guatemalan newspaper
 Siglo XXI (Madrid Metro), a station on Line ML-3
 Siglo XXI (publisher), a Spanish-language book publisher with business presences in Spain, Argentina, and Mexico
 Siglo XXI (basketball), a Spanish basketball training center for young boys and girls

See also 
 21st century (disambiguation)